Batty Weerakoon, (20 January 1932 – 7 October 2019), was a Sri Lankan Trotskyist. He was the former Minister of Science and Technology, Minister of Justice and Ethnic Affairs, and General Secretary of the Lanka Sama Samaja Party (LSSP).

Born in Matale, Weerakoon was educated at Trinity College, Kandy and at the University of Ceylon where he read English. During his university he was the President of the Student’s Council in 1955. He served as private secretary to Dr N. M. Perera. He later qualified as an Advocate, having practiced under Colvin R. de Silva.

References
 

1932 births
2019 deaths
Alumni of Trinity College, Kandy
Alumni of the University of Ceylon
Justice ministers of Sri Lanka
Members of the 10th Parliament of Sri Lanka
Members of the 11th Parliament of Sri Lanka
Lanka Sama Samaja Party politicians
Ceylonese advocates
Sinhalese lawyers
Sinhalese politicians
Sri Lankan socialists
Sri Lankan Trotskyists
People from Matale